The Texas Tech University Press (or TTUP), founded in 1971, is the university press of the American Texas Tech University, located in Lubbock, Texas. The press is a member of the Association of University Presses.

See also

 List of English-language book publishing companies
 List of university presses
 Texas A&M University Press
 University of Texas Press

References

External links
 , the official website of the Texas Tech University Press

1971 establishments in Texas
Book publishing companies based in Texas
Publishing companies established in 1971
Press
University presses of the United States